OMDB may refer to:

 the ICAO airport code for Dubai International Airport
 Over my dead body (disambiguation), several topics
 Online music database
 "OMDB", a song by Rod Wave from the album SoulFly (2021)
 "OMDB", a song by Big Red Machine from their debut album of the same name (2018)
 “OMDB”, the Open Media Database